Indonesia has been regularly competing at the Deaflympics from 2009. Indonesia had won 2 medals in the 2013 Summer Deaflympics, the only instance the nation bagged a medal in a Deaflympics event. 

Indonesia yet to compete at the Winter Deaflympics.

Medal tallies

Summer Deaflympics

See also 
 Indonesia at the Olympics
 Indonesia at the Paralympics

References 

Nations at the Deaflympics
D
Deaf culture in Indonesia